Laurieann Gibson (born July 14, 1969) is a Canadian choreographer, director, television personality, singer, actress, and dancer. She has choreographed dance numbers for musical artists such as Michael Jackson, Alicia Keys, Lady Gaga, and Beyoncé. Her music video directing credits include "Judas", "You and I", and "Love to My Cobain".

In 2005, Gibson rose to prominence on the MTV reality series, Making the Band, and later worked as a judge on Little Talent Show, Skating with the Stars, and So You Think You Can Dance. Gibson also had a brief musical career, in which she released two albums.

Life and career
Gibson was born in Toronto, Ontario, Canada on July 14, 1969. She rose to public prominence as the star of MTV's Making the Band and P. Diddy and Mark Burnett's Starmaker series. Gibson was also a "Fly Girl" on the popular TV series In Living Color.

Following her training at the Alvin Ailey American Dance Theater, Gibson went from theatre dance to hip hop, becoming director of choreography for Motown Records and Bad Boy Records. She has worked with Michael Jackson, Alicia Keys, and Beyoncé. She has also done choreography for the movies Alfie and Honey, in which she also appeared as Jessica Alba's dance rival.

In November 2011, Lady Gaga ended her professional relationship with Gibson due to "creative differences".

In 2012, Gibson directed BIGBANG's World Tour.

Gibson was the choreographer for Gugu Mbatha-Raw in Beyond the Lights, training her for 6 months in order to perfect her pop-star persona. 

In 2017, Gibson was featured on Lifetime's Dance Moms as a choreographer for Abby Lee Miller's Elite Competition Team.

In 2019, Gibson became a judge on the sixteenth season of So You Think You Can Dance alongside, Nigel Lythgoe, Mary Murphy, and fellow newcomer Dominic "D-Trix" Sandoval.

In 2020, Gibson was awarded the inaugural Willie Dunn Award by the Prism Prize committee, to honour her work as a choreographer and director of music videos.

Choreography

1997: Missy Elliott – "The Rain (Supa Dupa Fly)"
2000: Lil' Kim – "No Matter What They Say"
2004: Brandy – "Afrodisiac"
2004: Brandy – "Talk About Our Love"
2004: JoJo – "Leave (Get Out)"
2005: JoJo – "Not That Kinda Girl"
2006: Danity Kane – "Show Stopper"
2006: Danity Kane – "Ride for You"
2007: LAX Gurlz – "Forget You" 
2008: Lady Gaga – "Beautiful, Dirty, Rich"
2008: Lady Gaga – "Poker Face"
2009: Cassie – "Must Be Love"
2009: Lady Gaga – "LoveGame"
2009: Lady Gaga – "Paparazzi"
2009: Lady Gaga – "Bad Romance"
2009:  Sun Ho - "Fancy Free"
2010: Katy Perry – "California Gurls"
2010: Lady Gaga – "Telephone"
2010: Lady Gaga – "Alejandro"
2010: Keri Hilson – "The Way You Love Me"
2010: Natalia Kills – "Mirrors"
2010: Nicki Minaj – "Check It Out" 2010 VMA Pre-Show
2011: Lady Gaga – "Born This Way"
2011: Lady Gaga – "Judas"
2011: Natalia Kills – "Wonderland"
2011: JoJo – "The Other Chick"
2011: Lady Gaga – "The Edge of Glory" – live performances
2011: Six D – "Best Damn Night"
2011: Lady Gaga – "Yoü and I"
2012: Nicki Minaj – "Roman Holiday" – 54th Grammy Awards performance
2012: Cassie – "King of Hearts"
2012: Big Bang – "Big Bang Alive Galaxy Tour 2012"
2013: AGNEZ MO – "Coke Bottle" featuring Timbaland and T.I
2013: Nicki Minaj – "High School" – 2013 Billboard Music Awards performance
2001–2017: Britney Spears
2016: Britney Spears – Medley Billboard Music Awards
2017: Dance Moms
2018: Britney Spears – Britney Spears: Piece of Me Tour

Filmography

Television

1993–1994: In Living Color – Fly Girl dancer
2005–2009: Making the Band
2006: Little Talent Show – judge
2009: P. Diddy's Starmaker
2010: Skating with the Stars – judge
2011: The Dance Scene
2011: Born to Dance
2013: Mary Mary
2017: Dance Moms
2018: Laurieann Gibson:Beyond the Spotlight- Herself
2019: So You Think You Can Dance – judge

Film
2003: Honey – choreographer, cameo appearance as Katrina
2011: Lady Gaga Presents the Monster Ball Tour: At Madison Square Garden – director, choreographer, cameo appearance
2011: Honey 2 – cameo appearance

Video
2010: Keri Hilson – "The Way You Love Me"
2011: Lady Gaga – "Judas" – codirector
2011: Lady Gaga – "You and I" – codirector
2013: Jeffree Star – "Love to My Cobain" – codirector

Awards & Nominations 
Gibson has been nominated for 1 Primetime Emmy, 3 MTV Video Music Awards (winning 1), and 1 Teen Choice Award

Discography
2006: Addictive
2012: Last Chance

References

External links
Superstardance Biography
EUR Web

1969 births
Living people
20th-century Canadian actresses
21st-century Canadian actresses
Actresses from Toronto
Black Canadian actresses
Black Canadian dancers
Black Canadian filmmakers
Black Canadian women
Canadian choreographers
Canadian expatriate actresses in the United States
Canadian female dancers
Canadian film actresses
Canadian hip hop singers
Canadian music video directors
Canadian musical theatre actresses
Canadian stage actresses
Canadian television actresses
Canadian television personalities
Canadian women choreographers
Canadian women singers
Canadian women television personalities
Dance teachers
Female music video directors
Musicians from Toronto
So You Think You Can Dance choreographers